Sergio Iván Esquivel Cortés (8 December 1946 – 24 April 2021) was a Mexican singer-songwriter.

He recorded more than 20 albums as a performer. He wrote more than 350 songs which have been performed by singers such as José José, Emmanuel, Christian Castro, Marco Antonio Muñiz, Lupita D’Alessio, and others.

References

Mexican singer-songwriters
1946 births
2021 deaths
People from Yucatán